Capital Mall is a shopping mall located in Jefferson City, Missouri, United States that opened in 1978. Its anchors are JCPenney and Dillard's. Sears closed in March 2017.

In 2013, the mall's owner, Farmer Holding Company, applied to Jefferson City for approval to build a 127-room hotel and  conference center at Capital Mall.  Each would cost approximately $14 million. It was never built.

Anchors
JCPenney
Dillard's

References

Further reading
Jefferson City brothers purchase Capital Mall
Mid-Missouri Company Sets Hopes on Reviving Area Mall
Capital Mall development plans unveiled
Farmers say Capital Mall purchase ‘positive for Jefferson City’
New Capital Mall manager plans to add stores, host events

External links

Tourist attractions in Jefferson City, Missouri
Buildings and structures in Jefferson City, Missouri
Shopping malls in Missouri
Shopping malls established in 1978
1978 establishments in Missouri
Buildings and structures in Cole County, Missouri